The 1956 UMass Redmen football team represented the University of Massachusetts Amherst in the 1956 NCAA College Division football season as a member of the Yankee Conference in the NCAA's newly created College Division. The team was coached by Charlie O'Rourke and played its home games at Alumni Field in Amherst, Massachusetts. UMass finished the season with a record of 2–5–1 overall and 1–4 in conference play.

Schedule

References

Umass
UMass Minutemen football seasons
Umass Redmen football